Dorian Delafuente, also known as BabiBoi is a rapper based in the United States.

BabiBoi is part of a queer art collective called House of Lepore.

In May 2020 Billboard featured BabiBoi in "Billboard Pride", which is that publication's LGBT music recommendation playlist.

BabiBoi was a featured performer at the 2020 SXSW Vogue Ball.

Personal life
Babiboi is non-binary, and uses they/she pronouns.

References

External links

Living people
21st-century American singers
American gay musicians
LGBT rappers
American LGBT singers
Rappers from San Antonio
1999 births
20th-century American LGBT people
21st-century American LGBT people
Non-binary musicians